Delirio may refer to:

 Delirio (film), 1944
 Delirio, a 2007 album by Sinergia
 "Delirio", a song by Luis Miguel from Segundo Romance

See also
 Delirio de Grandeza (disambiguation)